The Battle of Kauhajoki was fought between Swedish and Russian troops on August 10, 1808.

History 
After the important Swedish victory at the Battle of Lapua the force under the command of Georg Carl von Döbeln defeated a Russian force near Kauhajoki, South Ostrobothnia, Finland.

References

Sources

Kauhajoki
Kauhajoki 1808
Kauhajoki
Kauhajoki
Kauhajoki
History of South Ostrobothnia
August 1808 events